Beloved Sisters is a 2014 German biographical film  written and directed by Dominik Graf. The film is based on the life of the German poet Friedrich Schiller (1759–1805) and upon his long relationships with two sisters, Caroline and Charlotte von Lengefeld. Schiller was ultimately married to Charlotte von Lengefeld.

The film was nominated for the Golden Bear Award at the 64th Berlin International Film Festival, and had its premiere at the festival. It was selected as the German entry for the Best Foreign Language Film at the 87th Academy Awards, but was not nominated.

Cast

See also
 List of submissions to the 87th Academy Awards for Best Foreign Language Film
 List of German submissions for the Academy Award for Best Foreign Language Film

References

Further reading
 An extended review in English.

External links

2014 films
2014 biographical drama films
2014 romantic drama films
2010s German-language films
German biographical drama films
Biographical films about writers
Films set in the 1780s
Films set in the 1790s
Films about sisters
Cultural depictions of Friedrich Schiller
2010s German films
Films directed by Dominik Graf